Thung Khao Phuang is a tambon (subdistrict) of Chiang Dao District, in Chiang Mai Province, Thailand. In 2020 it had a total population of 10,842 people.

History
The subdistrict was created effective June 1, 1983 by splitting off 5 administrative villages from Mueang Ngai.

Administration

Central administration
The tambon is subdivided into 7 administrative villages (muban).

Local administration
The whole area of the subdistrict is covered by the subdistrict municipality (Thesaban Tambon) Thung Khao Phuang (เทศบาลตำบลทุ่งข้าวพวง).

References

External links
Thaitambon.com on Thung Khao Phuang

Tambon of Chiang Mai province
Populated places in Chiang Mai province